It's Morrissey, Man! is an album by saxophonist Dick Morrissey. It was recorded on 27 April 1961. It was Morrissey's first album as a leader. The liner notes were written by Benny Green. In 1998, Polygram's Redial division, run by Richard Cook, reissued the album as a CD.

Reception
A contemporaneous Jazz Journal review commented: "Morrissey is well able to sustain interest over several choruses, and builds his solos excellently. Jones [on piano] is far less impressive, and his solos are almost invariably an anticlimax. Cecil and Barnes [bass and drums] work together well, and provide a driving beat." Four decades later, a Daily Telegraph writer stated that the album had "caused a great stir among musicians and jazz insiders but failed to register greatly with the wider jazz public".

Track listing 
"St. Thomas" (Sonny Rollins) 3:54
"Cherry Blue" (Bill Le Sage) 3:13
"A Bench in the Park" (Milton Ager, Jack Yellen) 3:06
"Sancticity" (Coleman Hawkins) 3:27
"Mildew" (Johnny Griffin) 3:00
"Puffing Billy" (Stan Jones) 4:23
"Gurney Was Here (Or Blue Waltz)" (Jones) 2:48
"Happy Feet" (Ager, Yellen) 3:07
"Where Is Love?" (Lionel Bart) 3:57
"Dancing in the Dark" (Arthur Schwartz, Howard Dietz) 3:37
"Willow Weep for Me"  (Ann Ronell) 4:50
"Jellyroll" (Charles Mingus) 2:59

Personnel 
 Dick Morrissey - tenor saxophone
 Stan Jones - piano
 Malcolm Cecil - bass
 Colin Barnes - drums

References

1961 debut albums
Dick Morrissey albums
Fontana Records albums